Franz Breisig (1868–1934) was a German mathematician, chiefly known for his work on quadripoles (1921), later to be known as two-port networks.

Publications
Breisig, Dr F, Theoretische Telegraphie, Braunschweig, F. Vieweg und Sohn, 1910.

Patents
Breisig, F, Method and Arrangement for Determining Crosstalk in Multicircuit Systems, US patent 492 034, filed 13 Aug 1921, issued 30 Jun 1925

See also

Black box

References
Belevitch, V, "Summary of the history of circuit theory", Proceedings of the IRE, vol 50, Iss 5, pp. 848–855, May 1962.

Engineers from North Rhine-Westphalia
1868 births
1934 deaths
Scientists from Wuppertal